Jon R. Lantz (October 2, 1952 – March 3, 2007) was an American football coach. He served as the head football coach at Southeastern Oklahoma State University from 1986 to 1988 and Missouri Southern State University from 1989 to 1997, compiling a career college football coaching record of 71–45–3.

Head coaching record

College

Notes

References

1952 births
2007 deaths
Missouri Southern Lions football coaches
Oklahoma Panhandle State Aggies football coaches
Oklahoma Panhandle State Aggies football players
Southeastern Oklahoma State Savage Storm football coaches
High school football coaches in Oklahoma
People from Pawnee City, Nebraska
Players of American football from Nebraska